The seventeenth series of Warsaw Shore, a Polish television programme based in Warsaw, Poland was announced in  April 2022 and began airing on 18 September 2022. The series was filmed in Wrocław, making this the second series to be filmed there following the fifth series in 2016. The team took a trip to the Czech Republic and then returned to Wrocław, finally settling in Warsaw.This is also the first series not to include Daniel "Arnold" Jabłoński, Patrycja Morkowska, Radosław "Diva" Majchrowski, and the original member Ewelina Kubiak after their departures the previous season. It was also the first series to include five new cast members, Aleksandra Okrzesik, Przemysław "Sequento" Skulski, Wiktoria "Jaszczur" Robert, Dominik Gul and Małgorzata "Gosia" Jeziorowska. The series also featured the brief return of two former cast members Alan Kwieciński and Ewa Piekut.  This was the final series to include cast members Jeremiasz "Jez" Szmigiel y Kamil Jagielsk.

Cast 
 Alan Kwieciński (Episodes 7–8)
 Aleksandra "Ola" Okrzesik
 Radosław "Diva" Majchrowski (Episodes 1–2, 7)
 Dominik Gul (Episode 1–2)
 Małgorzata "Gosia" Jeziorowska (Episodes 1–2)
 Jeremiasz "Jez" Szmigiel
 Kamil Jagielski
 Lena Majewska
 Milena Łaszek
 Oliwia Dziatkiewicz
 Patryk Spiker
 Michał "Sarna" Sarnowski
 Przemysław "Sequento" Skulski
 Wiktoria "Jaszczur" Robert

Duration of cast

Notes 

 Key:  = "Cast member" is featured in this episode.
 Key:  = "Cast member" arrives in the house.
 Key:  = "Cast member" voluntarily leaves the house.
 Key:  = "Cast member" returns to the house.
 Key:  = "Cast member" leaves the series.
 Key:  = "Cast member" returns to the series.
 Key:  = "Cast member" is removed from the series.
 Key:  = "Cast member" does not feature in this episode.

Off screen exits 
 During the second episode, Jakub Henke the Boss announced that Dominik and Gosia had been removed from the house for breaking the rules, and would not be returning for the remainder of the series. This led to the eventual departure of Dominik and Gosia from the show.

Episodes

References

Series 17